The Iron Redox Flow Battery (IRFB), also known as Iron Salt Battery (ISB), stores and releases energy through the electrochemical reaction of iron salt. This type of battery belongs to the class of redox-flow batteries (RFB), which are alternative solutions to Lithium-Ion Batteries (LIB) for stationary applications. The IRFB can achieve up to 70% round trip energy efficiency. In comparison, other long duration storage technologies such as pumped hydro energy storage provide slightly higher efficiencies .

Science

Setup and Materials 
The setup of IRFBs is based on the same general setup as other redox-flow battery types. It consists of two tanks, which in the uncharged state store electrolytes of dissolved iron(II) ions. The electrolyte is pumped into the battery cell which consists of two separated half-cells. The electrochemical reaction takes place at the electrodes within each half-cell. These can be carbon-based porous felts, paper or cloth. Porous felts are often utilized as the surface area of the electrode is high. The bipolar and the monopolar plates are typically carbon-based materials. The monopolar plates are in contact with the respective electrode and the current collector. Bipolar plates separate adjacent cells and are in contact with a positive electrode on one side and a negative electrode on the other. The half-cells are separated by a separator. This can be an anionic exchange membrane, a cationic exchange membrane or a porous separator. During the reaction, the charge within the electrolyte is balanced by migration of charged species through the separator. This can be H+ with a cationic exchange membrane, Cl− with an anionic exchange membrane, or both with a porous separator. The advantage of using a membrane lies in the high selectivity of the species crossing through the separator. The porous separator is a cheaper alternative often with low resistivity, however, the species crossover is solely dependent on the size of the separators’ pores and the size of the species. Therefore, the porous separator is less selective. The crossover of iron(III) from the positive to the negative half-cell can lead to coulombic efficiency loss as it will react with the iron(0) on the negative side (Reaction 5).  

The single cells are then stacked and electrically connected in series via bipolar plates, forming a battery stack.

Reactions 
The energy storage is based on the electrochemical reaction of iron salts. During charge, the iron(II) salt oxidises to iron(III) salt in the positive half-cell (Reaction 1) whilst in the negative half-cell iron(II) is reduced to iron(0) (Reaction 2). The latter reaction is also referred to as the plating reaction, as iron(0) is deposited onto the negative electrode, forming a solid surface. During discharge the plated iron(0) is dissolved back into the electrolyte forming iron(II), whilst iron(III) reacts back to iron(II) in the positive half-cell.

The nominal cell voltage of an IRFB is 1.21 V. During the charge/discharge reaction, the colour of the positive electroyte changes. Iron(III) chloride has a brown colour whilst iron(II) chloride is light green.

Side Reactions 
Unwanted side reactions lead to coulombic efficiency and capacity loss because charge is irreversibly lost.

The acidic iron electrolyte can oxidize when it is in contact with air, therefore, mitigating measures need to be taken (e.g., operating under inert atmosphere) to prevent air oxidation (Reaction 4).  

Air oxidation:                          4 Fe2+(aq) + O2 + 4 H+ → 4 Fe3+(aq)+ 2 H2O                                                                         (4)

Further, Fe3+ can migrate through the separator and react with the plated Fe0 on the negative side forming Fe2+. This migration especially takes place when using a microporous separator (Reaction 5).

Crossover reaction:                   Fe3+(aq)+ Fe0(s)⇌ 2 Fe2+(aq)                                                                                               (5)

During charge, hydrogen will evolve, as the standard potential of the hydrogen evolution reaction (HER) lies between the standard potential of Fe2+/Fe3+ and of Fe2+/Fe0. The acidic protons H+ in solution react to form hydrogen gas (Reaction 7) whilst iron(II) oxidises in the positive half-cell (Reaction 6). The HER is pH dependent. At lower pH values, the concentration of H+ is high, which increases the kinetics of the side reaction. Over time, the pH increases on the negative side. At a pH ≥ ~4, insoluble iron hydroxide forms and deposits onto the separator. This leads to increased resistance of ionic transfer, reduced coulombic and voltaic efficiency and ultimately cell failure.

Positive half-cell:                     Fe2+(aq) → Fe3+(aq) + e−                                E0 = +0.77 V                                 (6)

HER at negative half-cell:        H+ + e− → ½ H2(g)                                          E0 = 0.00 V                                   (7)

Operating Conditions

pH 
The IRFB needs to operate at pH values below 3.5. The iron(III) salt precipitates at pH > 3.5 forming insoluble Fe(OH)3 which is also referred to as rust. However, at low pH values more hydrogen will evolve during charge on the negative side. The coulombic efficiency can be increased by higher pH values.

Temperature 
Hruska et al. studied the temperature effect on the performance of the IRFB. The voltaic efficiency increases at higher temperature due to higher electrolyte conductivity and a decrease in electrode polarisation. Additionally, higher temperatures of ~60 °C improve the iron deposition kinetics in comparison to the hydrogen evolution reaction, thus increasing the coulombic efficiency.

The IRFB can also operate at lower temperatures (~ 5 °C), however, the reaction kinetics are reduced, leading to lower voltaic efficiency.

Electrolyte composition 
The base electrolyte consists of iron(II) salts which are dissolved in water. SO42- or Cl− are possible counter ions. Iron(II) chloride is often the preferred choice as the conductivity is higher than iron(II) sulphate. By increasing the ionic conductivity of the electrolyte, the voltaic efficiency, and thus the overall energy efficiency, can be increased. NH4Cl, (NH4)2SO4, KCl, Na2SO4 and NaCl are possible supporting additives.

Further additives were investigated to minimise rust precipitation. Complexing the iron salt with ligands can hinder the precipitation of Fe(OH)3 as the ligands stabilise the iron salt. Possible additives which were looked into are citrate, DMSO, glycerol, malic acid, malonic acid and xylitol.

Buffer additives (e.g., ascorbic acid) help to maintain a constant pH during hydrogen production. Additionally, these additives adsorb onto the active sites of the electrode, blocking these sites for the H+ adsorption and increase the overpotential for the hydrogen evolution reaction.

One main challenge is to reduce the hydrogen evolution reaction. One method is through co-deposition of a different metal (e.g., cadmium), which can hinder the HER, and improve the coulombic efficiency during iron deposition.

Rebalancing Systems 
There have been different approaches to solving the issue with the HER. Additives in the electrolyte can reduce the production of hydrogen (see chapter Electrolyte), however, additives cannot fully eliminate the HER. Therefore, alternative solutions are proposed in literature.

The counter reaction of HER can be achieved in a chemical or electrochemical manner. Chemical solutions are trickle-bed reactors or in-tank hydrogen-ferric ion recombination systems. An electrochemical approach is coupling a hydrogen-iron fuel cell to the IRFB. This can bring the IRFB back to the original state of health.

The trickle-bed reactor is a chemical reactor with a packed bed containing a catalyst (e.g. Platin). This type of rebalancing system is coupled to the IRFB. The electrolyte from the IRFB is flushed into the packed bed from the top of the reactor whilst hydrogen gas is forwarded from the bottom. At the three-phase-boundary (catalyst, hydrogen gas, electrolyte) the chemical reaction between excess iron(III) and hydrogen takes place forming iron(II) and H+. The excess gas removed from the trickle-bed reactor and the electrolyte is then pumped back into the IRFB.

The in-tank rebalancing system is also based on the chemical reaction of iron(III) and H2, but takes place in the positive tank of the IRFB. Hydrogen produced within the negative half-cell is forwarded from the negative to the positive tank. A felt is positioned perpendicular to the liquid level into the positive electrolyte. The upper part is coated with a catalytic layer (e.g. Platinum). Through capillary effect, the positive electrolyte flows through the felt to the catalytic layer. Here, at the three-phase boundary (catalyst, H2, Fe3+) the chemical reaction takes place forming H+ and Fe2+.

A different option is to couple the IRFB with a hydrogen-iron fuel cell. The produced hydrogen from the IRFB is forwarded to the negative side of the rebalancing fuel cell system whilst the electrolyte of the IRFB is pumped to the positive side. On the negative side, the hydrogen reacts to acidic protons (H+) at a catalytic layer (e.g., Platinum, Palladium). On the negative side, the excess Fe3+ is reduced to Fe2+ (Reaction 8).

Rebalancing Reaction:              2 Fe3+(aq) + ½ H2 (g) → 2 Fe2+(aq) + H+                                                                             (8)

Advantages and Disadvantages

Advantages 
The advantage of redox-flow batteries in general is the separate scalability of power and energy, which makes them good candidates for stationary energy storage systems. This is because the power is only dependent on the stack size while the capacity is only dependent on the electrolyte volume.

As the electrolyte is based on water, it is non-flammable. All electrolyte components are non-toxic and abundantly available. The reactants in both half-cells are soluble salts of the same species and only differ in their oxidation state (Fe0, Fe2+, Fe3+). This means that unwanted membrane crossover of the active species does not lead to irreversible reactant loss, but can be rebalanced using either a trickle-bed reactor or a fuel cell. Iron chloride is cheaply and widely available as it is a by-product for steel production.

The IRFB is stable within different temperature ranges, therefore, the stationary energy storage can be used in regions with higher temperature without the need of a thermal management system. [5] The battery efficiency would even benefit from higher temperatures. Other battery types (e.g. Vanadium-Redox-Flow Batteries (VRFB)) cannot perform at higher temperatures. For instance, toxic Vanadium pentoxide (V2O5) in VRFBs precipitates at ~ 40 °C.

Overall, the components are low in cost (2 $/kg iron) and abundantly available. All the other parts (e.g. membrane, bipolar plate, monopolar plate, frames, gaskets, pumps) are widely available on the market and associated costs can be expected to decrease as production of these batteries scales up.

Additionally, compared to lithium-ion batteries with expected lifetimes of ~1000 cycles, the IRFB promises a potential battery lifetime of > 20 years with over 10.000 cycles.

Disadvantages 
The capacity is not solely dependent on the electrolyte volume as is the case with other RFBs which are only based on electrochemical reactions in solution (e.g. VRFB). Rather, in an IRFB the plating iron volume within the negative half-cell has an influence on the capacity. Thus, the energy capacity and stack size are not completely decoupled as is the case with other RFB.

During the charge reaction, hydrogen evolves on the negative side, reducing coulombic efficiency. Additionally, the pH increase leads to insoluble Fe(OH)3 (rust) precipitation which untreated can lead to cell death. However, a rebalancing system can bring the IRFB back to a state of health.

Compared to non-RFB systems, all flow batteries include auxiliary components such as pumps and valves, which do require a regular maintenance cycle.

Application 
The IRFB can be used as large-scale energy storage systems to store energy at low demand from renewable energy sources (e.g., solar, wind, water) and release the energy at higher demand. As the energy transition from fossil fuels to renewable energy sources is progressing, the demand for storing the excess energy is increasing.

ESS Inc. is an American company developing and building IRFBs with > 20.000 cycles, storing energy of 4 to 12 hours, with capacities up to 600 kWh and optional power configurations between 50 kW and 90 kW.

VoltStorage GmbH is a German based company focussing on the European market. The goal is to develop cascadeable batteries up to 5 x 50 kWh with 9.4 MW or 234 MWh per acre with efficiencies of 70%, with a lifetime of > 20 years and > 10.000 cycles.

Sacramento Municipal Utility District installed an iron flow battery in September 2022

History 
Hruska et al. introduced the IRFB in 1981 and further analysed the system in terms of material choice, electrolyte additives, temperature and pH effect. The group set the groundwork for further development. In 1979, Thaller et. al. introduced an iron-hydrogen fuel cell as a rebalancing cell for the chromium-iron redox flow battery  which was adapted 1983 for the iron-redox flow batteries by Stalnake et al. Further development went into the fuel cell as a separate system.

The IRFB has continuously been developed since the introduction of the system. Petek et al. substituted the solid felt electrodes with slurry electrodes (e.g. MWCNT). Research groups worked on analysing different additives to minimise HER. [8] Noack et al. investigated different supporting salts (e.g. K+, Cs+, Mg2+, Al3+) and secondary metals in 2021 with Cu, Tl, Pd and Cd being promising metals.

Adding ligands to the electrolyte, thus, forming iron complexes, increases the cell voltage. Gong et al. combined different redox pairs with different ligands and increased the cell voltage from 1.2 V to 1.34 V with [Fe(CN)6]3- / [Fe(CN)6]4- and [Fe(TEOA)OH]− / [Fe(TEOA)OH]2- in an alkaline environment.

Different rebalancing systems were analysed  and Noack et. al. further investigated coupling the IRFB with a fuel cell as a rebalancing system.

The development is ongoing as the motivation to alternative energy storages is high.

Data

References 

Flow batteries